Sweet Bird of Youth is a 1989 drama TV film starring Elizabeth Taylor and Mark Harmon. Based on the 1959 play by Tennessee Williams, it focuses on the relationship between a drifter and a faded movie star. The film was adapted by Gavin Lambert and directed by Nicolas Roeg.

Plot
After failing to make it in the film industry, drifter Chance Wayne decides to leave to return to his hometown. Fading film star Alexandra Del Lago is in her third marriage. Her latest husband is a prince, and she is now has the title of a Princess. Horrified by her own closeups in her latest film, she flees with Chance. She uses alcohol and drugs to anesthetize the pain of growing older. Back in his hometown, Chance seeks to resume his love affair with Heavenly Finley, the daughter of the local political boss.

Cast

 Elizabeth Taylor as Alexandra Del Lago, Princess Kosmonopolis
 Mark Harmon as Chance Wayne
 Valerie Perrine as Miss Lucy
 Kevin Geer as Tom Junior
 Seymour Cassel as Hatcher
 Ronnie Claire Edwards as Aunt Nonnie
 Cheryl Paris as Heavenly Finley
 Rip Torn as Boss Finley
 Charles Lucia as Dr. George Scudder
 Theodore Wilson as Fly
 Megan Blake as Violet
 John Fleck as Mission Man
 Billy Ray Sharkey as Scotty
 Ruta Lee as Sally Powers
 Hal England as Minister
 Nurit Koppel as Edna
 Martha Milliken as Virginia
 Michael Shaner as Driver
 Angela Teek as Singer
 Tery Lockett as Hotel Waiter
 Michael Wilding Jr.
 Tom Nolan
 Avon Hill

Production
Stephen Farber of The New York Times wrote, "In doing his adaptation, Mr. Lambert made some radical simplifications, reducing the Boss Finley story to a bare minimum." Sweet Bird of Youth, "like many other Williams plays, was rewritten several times by the playwright, and Mr. Lambert consulted the different versions that still exist," Farber wrote. The castration in the play, which was removed from the 1962 film adaptation, is included in the 1989 TV movie adaptation. "In some ways," Farber wrote, "the television film is bolder than the 1962 movie version of the play, which starred Geraldine Page and Paul Newman in the roles they had also created on Broadway. Because of censorship at the time, Richard Brooks, the writer-director, could not suggest the castration and was forced instead to end the film with Chance brutally beaten. ... Like the stage version, the TV film will not actually show the castration, but there will be a few clear references to the intention of emasculating Chance."

Filming took place in Upland, California. On May 11 and 12, 1989, vintage convertibles with Florida license plates drove through downtown Upland as cameras rolled. The interior of the Sea Cove bar was used as was the former Atwood's Department Store. A political rally was shot at the gazebo.

This was Elizabeth Taylor's fourth role in a Tennessee Williams adaptation.

Rip Torn, who had already played Chance Wayne in the original 1959 Broadway production and Thomas J. Finley, Jr. in the 1962 film adaptation, was cast as a third character, Boss Finley, for the 1989 TV movie adaptation. His scenes were filmed separately from scenes with Elizabeth Taylor and Mark Harmon, so he didn't get to see much of them. This differs from the play, in which the Princess and Boss are involved in one scene together. "On stage, when we did it, the Princess comes on during the political rally downstairs when the Boss is doing his thing," said Torn. "She drives by in her convertible."

Broadcast
The film was broadcast on NBC on Sunday, October 1, 1989.

Reception
In his review for The New York Times on Sept. 29, 1989, John J. O'Connor wrote, "Apparently gaining weight again, Miss Taylor wears loose-fitting clothes and is often displayed in extremely dim lighting, which tends to shove Mr. Harmon further into the shadows. This is not the meeting of equals. This is a star turn. And it's a shame. The play and these performers are better than that. Still we get Tennessee Williams, one of the major playwrights of this century. And on commercial television these days, that's something to be grateful for."

Alan Carter of People gave the film a C+, calling it a "sometimes slow-moving retelling of the classic Williams play and 1962 movie." In summary, he wrote, "Idiosyncratic film director Nicolas (The Man Who Fell to Earth) Roeg gives us endless close-ups of his two stars' dazzling blue eyes—but the production doesn't add up to anything memorable."

Joseph Walker of Deseret News wrote that the film, "with its seaminess and overt sexuality, is not the kind of Sunday night viewing everyone will enjoy. But those who are looking for some sophisticated drama that is well-played artistically and technically will find much to their liking here."

Brenda Murphy noted that, while Richard Brooks's adaptation focused on Chance Wayne, "Nicolas Roeg's centering of the Princess creates a darker film about the inevitable loss of youth and the despairing or resilient responses to it that are possible."

References

External links
 
 
 
 
 

1989 drama films
1989 television films
1989 films
American films based on plays
Films about actors
Films about princesses
Films based on works by Tennessee Williams
Films directed by Nicolas Roeg
Films set in Florida
Films shot in California
Southern Gothic films
The Kushner-Locke Company films
NBC network original films
American drama television films
1980s American films